Edenaveys is a small village and townland in County Armagh, Northern Ireland. It lies southeast of Armagh and is within the Armagh City and District Council area. Historically, it has been anglicized as Edenafeagh amongst other variations. It had a population of 190 people (80 households) in the 2011 Census. (2001 Census: 189 people)

References

See also 
List of villages in Northern Ireland

Villages in County Armagh
Townlands of County Armagh